Tim Whitehead may refer to:

 Tim Whitehead (ice hockey), American ice hockey coach
 Tim Whitehead (rugby union) (born 1988), South African rugby union player
 Tim Whitehead (musician), British jazz musician
 Timothy Whitehead (born 1997), South African cricketer